JAGS may refer to:

James Allen's Girls' School, south London 
Just another Gibbs sampler, simulation software 
JAGS McCartney International Airport, Turks and Caicos Islands 
Journal of the American Geriatrics Society

Jags may refer to:

Jags Panesar, a fictional character from EastEnders
The Jags, 1970s British rock band
Jacksonville Jaguars, NFL American football team
Jaguar Cars, "Jags" in the plural sense
Partick Thistle F.C., Scottish association football team

See also
JAG (disambiguation)
Jaguar (disambiguation)